Danggogae Station is a station on Line 4 of the Seoul Metropolitan Subway network. It was the northern terminus of Line 4, until 19 March 2022, when the line was extended to Jinjeop. It is an elevated station. The name of the subway station comes from its local name. Regional names refer to the pass that travelers carried over because of wild animals.

It is a three-story elevated station. The turnstile and station office are located on the second floor above ground, and the platform is located on the third floor above ground. There is a crossing line before entering this station. In the past, it was possible to cross the platform on the other side, but now the freight areas on both platforms are separated, so you cannot travel without going through the opening. There are five exits.

This station is located in Sanggye-dong, Nowon-gu, Seoul.

Station layout

Gallery

References 

Seoul Metropolitan Subway stations
Metro stations in Nowon District
Railway stations opened in 1993